The Linz Open, currently sponsored by Generali Gruppe, is a women's tennis tournament held in Linz, Austria. It is played on indoor hardcourts.

The inaugural event took place in 1987 in Wels, Austria and was organized by the ITF as a $10,000 tournament. Starting 1991, it has been organized in Linz as a WTA Tour event, initially on the Tier V-level. In 1993 it got promoted to Tier III-level, and since 1998 it was organized as a Tier II-tournament. Since the 2009 edition it is designated as a WTA International Tournament.

Past champions of the tournament include former world number ones Lindsay Davenport, Justine Henin-Hardenne, Amélie Mauresmo, Maria Sharapova and Ana Ivanovic. More recent champions include Petra Kvitová, Victoria Azarenka, Angelique Kerber, Karolína Plíšková and Dominika Cibulková.

Past finals

Singles

Doubles

See also
List of tennis tournaments

External links
Official website

 
Tennis tournaments in Austria
Indoor tennis tournaments
Hard court tennis tournaments
WTA Tour
Recurring sporting events established in 1987
Sport in Linz